Charleson is a given name and a surname. Notable people with the name include:

Surname
Bill Charleson (1929–1983), Australian rules footballer
Ian Charleson (1949–1990), Scottish actor
Leslie Charleson (born 1945), American actress
Mary Charleson (1890–1961), Irish silent film actress

Middle name
Ian Charleson Hedge (born 1928), Scottish botanist

See also

Carleson (disambiguation)
Charleston (name)
Charleton (name)